The T.L. Roach Jr. Unit is a state prison for men located in Childress, Childress County, Texas, owned and operated by the Texas Department of Criminal Justice.  This facility was opened in August 1991, and a maximum capacity of 1884 male inmates held at various security levels.

References

Prisons in Texas
Buildings and structures in Childress County, Texas
1991 establishments in Texas